Darko Vojvodić (born 8 May 1970) is a Bosnian Serb professional football manager and former player who is the manager of First League of FBiH club Vis Simm-Bau.

Playing career
Vojvodić played with Radnički Kragujevac in the 1995–96 Second League of FR Yugoslavia season. Then he played with Sartid Smederevo in the 1998–99 First League of FR Yugoslavia season.

In the season 1999–2000, Vojvodić was the topscorer of Sartid in the league with 9 goals. Next, he played with Montenegrin side Sutjeska Nikšić in the 2000–01 First League season, having scored 3 goals.

In 2002, he returned to Bosnia and Herzegovina and played with Sloboda Tuzla, Čelik Zenica and Budućnost Banovići in the Bosnian Premier League. He retired in 2008 while playing for Sloboda.

Managerial career
After finishing his playing career, Vojvodić was a manager of a number of Bosnian clubs.

He started in 2009, managing Sutjeska Foča and finished the first half of the season at top of the First League of RS. Next he coached Proleter Teslić, from where he moved to Drina Zvornik in September 2010.

He also managed his former club Sloboda Tuzla, Radnički Lukavac, Slavija Sarajevo, Travnik, GOŠK Gabela, with whom he won the 2016–17 First League of FBiH, and Tuzla City which was at that time known as "Sloga Simin Han".

Vojvodić worked as the manager of Borac Banja Luka, a position he came on in March 2018. In the 2018–19 First League of RS season, on 11 May 2019, in a 1–3 away win against Rudar Prijedor, he got Borac promoted back to the Bosnian Premier League. On 5 June 2019, Vojvodić decided to leave Borac after stating that the club did not want him to be the clubs's manager in the next season.

On 5 September 2019, he was named new manager of Serbian First League club Radnički 1923, a team he previously played at and also captained which was at the time known as "Radnički Kragujevac". His first win as Radnički manager was in a 1–0 home league match against Zlatibor Čajetina on 8 September 2019. In November 2019, he was sacked from the position of Radnički manager.

On 13 December 2019, Vojvodić became the new manager of, at the time, First League of FBiH club Olimpik. In Vojvodić's first official game as Olimpik manager, his team drew 1–1, but later lost in a penalty shootout against Široki Brijeg in the quarter-finals of the 2019–20 Bosnian Cup on 4 March 2020. His first win as Olimpik's manager was in a 2–0 home league match against Slaven Živinice on 7 March 2020. On 26 May 2020, the 2019–20 First League of FBiH season ended abruptly due to the COVID-19 pandemic in Bosnia and Herzegovina and by default, Olimpik, led by Vojvodić, were crowned league champions and got promoted back to the Bosnian Premier League. On 5 September 2020, he was let go by the club and replaced by Esad Selimović.

On 10 March 2021, Vojvodić was named new manager of First League of FBiH club Vis Simm-Bau.

Managerial statistics

Honours

Manager
GOŠK Gabela
First League of FBiH: 2016–17

Borac Banja Luka
First League of RS: 2018–19

Olimpik
First League of FBiH: 2019–20

References

External links
Darko Vojvodić at Sofascore

1973 births
Living people
People from Foča
Serbs of Bosnia and Herzegovina
Association football midfielders
Bosnia and Herzegovina footballers
FK Loznica players
FK Napredak Kruševac players
FK Radnički 1923 players
FK Smederevo players
FK Sutjeska Nikšić players
FK Milicionar players
FK Sloboda Tuzla players
NK Čelik Zenica players
FK Budućnost Banovići players
Second League of Serbia and Montenegro players
First League of Serbia and Montenegro players
Premier League of Bosnia and Herzegovina players
Bosnia and Herzegovina football managers
FK Drina Zvornik managers
FK Sloboda Tuzla managers
FK Radnički Lukavac managers
NK GOŠK Gabela managers
FK Slavija Sarajevo managers
NK Travnik managers
NK Zvijezda Gradačac managers
FK Tuzla City managers
FK Borac Banja Luka managers
FK Radnički 1923 managers
FK Olimpik managers
NK Vis Simm-Bau managers
Premier League of Bosnia and Herzegovina managers